Heta Rewiti Stewart (1869 – 3 December 1909); also known as Dick Stewart or Heta Reweti Stewart was a New Zealand rugby union player and a member of the 1888–89 New Zealand Native football team that toured Britain, Ireland, Australia and New Zealand in 1888 and 1889.

He played for the Thames club in South Auckland.

He died in Thames of Bright's disease.

References 
The New Zealand Rugby Register 1870-2015 (2016) by The New Zealand Rugby Museum, Palmerston North; p667 

1869 births
1909 deaths
New Zealand rugby union players
New Zealand Māori rugby union players